The 2019 season is Young Lion's 16th consecutive season in the top flight of Singapore football and in the S.League.

Squad

S.League squad

U19 Squad
(Singapore Sport School)

Coaching staff

Transfer

Pre-season transfer

In

Out

Retained

Trial

Mid-season transfer

In

Out

Friendly

Pre-Season Friendly

Tour of Malaysia (20 to 27 January)

Mid-Season Friendly

Tour of Thailand

Team statistics

Appearances and goals

Numbers in parentheses denote appearances as substitute. 

Note 1: Lionel Tan scored an own goal in the SPL match against Tampines Rovers.

Competitions

Overview

Singapore Premier League

See also 
 2017 Garena Young Lions FC season
 2018 Young Lions FC season

References

Young Lions FC
Young Lions FC seasons